Henry Porter may refer to:

Politicians
Henry Porter (MP) (1613–?), English politician who sat in the House of Commons in 1654 and 1656
Henry Porter (younger) (1636–?), English politician who sat in the House of Commons in 1659
Henry Kirke Porter (1840–1921), U.S. Representative from Pennsylvania
Henry Porter (MP for Coventry), see Coventry

Others
H. V. Porter (Henry Porter, 1891–1975), American educator and athletic administrator
Henry Porter (baseball) (1858–1906), 19th century baseball player
Henry Porter (Canadian admiral) (1922–2016), Canadian admiral
Henry Porter (cricketer) (1810–1878), English cricketer
Henry Porter (journalist) (born 1953), author of thrillers and journalist
Henry Porter (playwright) (died 1599), dramatist
Henry Porter (rugby league) (1910–1990), Australian rugby league footballer
Henry Martyn Porter (1835–1907), Civil War colonel and commander of the 7th Vermont Volunteer Infantry
Henry Rinaldo Porter (1848–1903), acting assistant surgeon in the 7th U.S. Cavalry at the Battle of the Little Big Horn